The Agenzia Nazionale Stampa Associata (ANSA; literally "National Associated Press Agency") is the leading news agency in Italy. ANSA is a not-for-profit cooperative, whose members and owners are 36 leading news organizations in Italy. Its mission is the distribution of fair and objective news reporting.

History
In January 1945, three representatives of the major political forces of the Italian Resistance, Giuseppe Liverani, managing director of "Il Popolo" (The People), Primo Parrini, managing director of Avanti!, and Amerigo Terenzi, CEO of L'Unità, advanced the possibility to organize a news agency as a cooperative of newspapers, not controlled by the government nor private groups, replacing the work of the Agenzia Stefani, moved to Milan to meet the information needs of the Italian Social Republic. Their proposal had the approval from the Allied military authorities who, a few months later, favored the success of the new agency by closing the Italian Notizie Nazioni Unite (NNU, United Nations News), an agency created by Psychological Warfare Division.  Some antifascist newspapers immediately adhered, and a makeshift headquarters was set up in Rome, at 15 Moretto Street, unofficially entrusting the direction of former NNU director Renato Mieli. ANSA's first publication came on 15 January 1945, in the form of a news release and distributed in the city of Rome. After a few weeks ANSA moved to the place formerly occupied by Agenzia Stefani, on Via di Propaganda.

Profile
The ANSA is a cooperative of 36 members of the main Italian newspapers publishers and is designed to collect and transmit information on the main events Italian and world. To this end, the ANSA has 22 offices in Italy and 81 offices in 78 other countries. It headquartered in Rome, in Via della Dataria, 94.

The agencies ANSA transmit more than 3,500 news and more than 1,500 photos a day that are transmitted to the Italian media, national institutions, local and international trade associations, political parties and trade unions. The ANSA news broadcasts national, local and sector-specific.

In addition to the news in Italian ANSA transmits its news in English, Spanish, German, Portuguese and Arabic.

Since 1996 the ANSA was the first agency in Italy to spread news via SMS.

From 1985 to 1994 as President of ANSA he was covered by journalist Giovanni Giovannini.

From 1997 to 2009, a diplomat, was president of ANSA.

Since 2003, the Ansa through AnsaMed provides a news service covering the countries of the Mediterranean basin.

Since 2009, the new president is Giulio Anselmi, former director of the ANSA from 1997 to 1999. On 10 June, Luigi Contu has been appointed managing director of the agency.

On 26 August 2014 a five-year partnership agreement (2015–2020) was signed between AP and ANSA for photos, text and video.

Directors
ANSA was founded on 15 January 1945, and it is based in Rome. The following is a list of the editor-in-chiefs ANSA has had in its history:

Edgardo Longoni (1945–1947)
Leonardo Azzarita (1947–1952)
Angelo Magliano (1952–1958)
Vittorino Arcangeli (1958–1961)
Sergio Lepri (1961–1990)
Bruno Caselli (1990–1997)
Giulio Anselmi (1997–1999)
Pierluigi Magnaschi (1999–2006)
Giampiero Gramaglia (2006–2009)
Luigi Contu (2009–present)

Organization
ANSA covers national and international events through its 22 offices in Italy, and its presence in more than 80 cities in 74 countries in the world. More than 2,000 news items are distributed every day by ANSA, together with more than 700 photos and several videos. ANSA multimedia production is distributed on all the digital platforms (web, TV, satellite, cellphones), using cutting-edge technologies. Among the more than 1,400 customers of ANSA productions, there are media companies, corporate firms, and the government.

In addition to its primary news website at ANSA.it, ANSA has a news website at ANSAmed.info (where 'med' is short for Mediterranean) which covers the current affairs of all the countries of the Mediterranean Basin. "The ANSAmed package consists of a news stream of about 200 stories and reports per day, in English, Italian and Arabic languages. The news covers Euro-Mediterranean and Middle Eastern political news, and economic and business reports from the area."

Recent events
On 11 February 2013, ANSA scooped media outlets throughout the world with its coverage of Pope Benedict XVI's resignation, due to correspondent Giovanna Chirri's fluency in Latin, which enabled her to instantly translate the news when it was first announced.

On 26 August 2014 was signed a five-year partnership agreement (2015–2020) between AP and ANSA for text, images and video.

Partners 
List of newspapers whose editors are members of ANSA:

l'Adige 	
Alto Adige
L'Arena
Avvenire
Bresciaoggi
Il Centro
Corriere della Sera
Corriere dello Sport
Il Corriere Mercantile
L'Eco di Bergamo
La Gazzetta del Mezzogiorno
Gazzetta del Sud
La Gazzetta dello Sport
Gazzetta di Mantova
Nuova Gazzetta di Modena
La Nuova Ferrara	
Gazzetta di Parma
Gazzetta di Reggio
Il Gazzettino
Il Giornale
Giornale di Brescia
Giornale di Sicilia
Il Giornale di Vicenza 	
Il Giorno
Libertà	 	
Il Mattino
Il Mattino di Padova
Il Messaggero
Messaggero Veneto
La Nazione
Il Piccolo
La Prealpina
La Provincia
La Provincia (di Cremona)
La Provincia Pavese
Il Resto del Carlino
La Sicilia
Il Secolo XIX
Il Sole-24 Ore
La Stampa 	
Il Tempo
Il Tirreno
Trentino
La Tribuna di Treviso
la Repubblica
La Nuova Sardegna 	
L'Unione Sarda
L'Unità
La Nuova Venezia

See also
 Ansa Mediterranean
 Agenzia Stefani, ANSA' s precursor
List of news agencies

References

External links 
 Official website (in Italian)
 News in English, Spanish and Portuguese
 European Union news for Mercosur countries in Portuguese and Spanish

1945 establishments in Italy
News agencies based in Italy
Mass media in Rome
Multilingual news services
Cooperatives in Italy
Italian news websites
Organizations established in 1945